María Casares (21 November 1922 – 22 November 1996) was a Spanish-born French actress and one of the most distinguished stars of the French stage and cinema. She was credited in France as Maria Casarès.

Early life
Casares was born María Victoria Casares y Pérez in A Coruña, Galicia, the daughter of Santiago Casares Quiroga, a minister in Manuel Azaña's government and Prime Minister of Spain, and of Gloria Pérez. She was a volunteer in Madrid hospitals already at age fourteen. Her father was a member of the Republican government so at the outbreak of the Spanish Civil War (1936), the family was forced to flee Spain. Her father went to London, but she and her mother sought refuge in Paris.

There, María attended the Victor Duruy school, where she learned French and was befriended by a teacher and his Spanish wife, who inspired her to go into the theatre. After graduation, she took voice classes with René Simon. She enrolled in the Paris Conservatoire, where she won First Prize for tragedy and Second Prize for comedy.

Career

In July 1942, she auditioned for Marcel Herrand who engaged her for his Théâtre des Mathurins. There, over the course of the next three years, she appeared in several plays including, Deirdre of the Sorrows by J. M. Synge, The Master Builder by Ibsen, Le Malentendu (The Misunderstanding) by Albert Camus (with whom she would later have a passionate affair), and an especially important premiere, Fédérico, after Prosper Mérimée, with Gérard Philipe.

Film

She began to appear in films. Her first film role was in Marcel Carné's Les Enfants du paradis (1945), one of the great classics of French cinema. She also made Les dames du Bois de Boulogne (1945) for Robert Bresson, La Chartreuse de Parme (The Charterhouse of Parma)  (1948) for Christian-Jaque, co-starring Gérard Philipe. For Cocteau, she played Death in his Orphée (1950) with Jean Marais and François Périer and in his  Testament d'Orphée (Testament of Orpheus) (1960).

In 1989, she was nominated for the César Award for Best Supporting Actress in La Lectrice.

Stage success
From 1952 onward, although she continued to appear in occasional films, she devoted herself mainly to the stage. She joined the Festival d'Avignon, the Comédie-Française and the Théâtre National Populaire under the leadership of Jean Vilar. Before her, no one actor or actress of foreign origin had ever played at Comédie-Française. She toured extensively throughout the world, appearing in the great classics of French theatre, including, in 1958, Corneille's Le Cid, Victor Hugo's Marie Tudor and  Marivaux' Le Triomphe de l'Amour (The Triumph of Love) on Broadway.

Personal life and death
Casares took French nationality in 1975 and three years later married André Schlesser, an actor known professionally as Dade, who had been her longtime companion and theatrical co-star.

She published her autobiography, Résidente privilégiée (Privileged Resident) in 1980, in which she described her 16-year affair with Albert Camus. The couple never married, but their extensive correspondence, first published in France in late 2017, lasted from 1944, with a five-year break to 1949, when they again had a chance meeting when their passion was rekindled until the end of Camus' life. She starred in a number of Albert Camus's plays and often threatened to end their stormy affair over his refusal to leave Francine Faure.

The actress died of colon cancer at her country house, Château de La Vergne, in the village of Alloue in Poitou-Charentes, on the day after her 74th birthday. She bequeathed the property to the village. Today, the Domaine de la Vergne is a residence for artists and a setting for performances.

Filmography

Films

Les Enfants du paradis (1945)  Nathalie
Les Dames du Bois de Boulogne (1945) Hélène
Roger la Honte (1946)  Julia de Noirville
The Revenge of Roger (1946) Julia de Terrenoire
 Love Around the House (1947) Thérèse
 The Seventh Door (1947)
Bagarres (1948) Carmelle
The Charterhouse of Parma (1948) La duchesse Gina de San Severina
 The Man Who Returns from Afar (1950)
Guernica (1950) (voice)
Orphée (1950) The Princess
Shadow and Light (1951)  Caroline Bessier
Le Jardins du Seigneur (1954) (voice)
Testament of Orpheus (1960) The Princess
Hieronymus Bosch (1963) (voice)
Flavia, la monaca musulmana (1974) Sister Agatha
Blanche et Marie (1985) Louise
Blood and Sand (1987) Dolores
The Reader (1988)  General's Widow
Monte bajo (1989)
Les Chevaliers de la table ronde (1990)  Viviane
Someone Else's America (1995)  Alonso's Mother

TV
 
Énigmes de l'histoire (1956)
Macbeth (1959) Lady Macbeth
Yerma (1963) Yerma
La Reine verte (1964)
L'Île des chèvres (1975) Agata
Britannicus (1977) Agrippine
Irène et sa folie (1980) Le docteur Burns
Peer Gynt (1981) Ase
Les Bonnes (1985) Madame
Les Nuits révolutionnaires (1989)  La Murène

References

Sources
 Résidente privilégiée, Fayard, 1980, 
 El periodismo es un cuento by Manuel Rivas (chapter: "La mujer rebelde"), Alfaguara, 1997, 
 Maria Casarès: L'étrangère by Javier Figuero & Marie-Hélène Carbonel, Fayard, 2005, 
 La extranjera by Javier Figuero, CreateSpace Independent Publishing Platform, February 2017, 
 Tu me vertiges. L'amour interdit de Maria Casarès et Albert Camus by Florence M.-Forsythe, Le Passeur Éditeur, March 2017, 
 Albert Camus, Maria Casarès. Correspondance inédite (1944–1959). Avant-propos de Catherine Camus. Gallimard, November 2017,

External links

1922 births
1996 deaths
Conservatoire de Paris alumni
Deaths from cancer in France
Deaths from colorectal cancer
Exiles of the Spanish Civil War in France
French film actresses
French National Academy of Dramatic Arts alumni
French people of Galician descent
French stage actresses
Naturalized citizens of France
People from A Coruña
Troupe of the Comédie-Française
20th-century French actresses